The Hansa-Brandenburg W.19 was a German fighter-reconnaissance aircraft of World War I. It was a single-engined two-seat biplane floatplane, and was a larger development of the successful W.12. It served with the Kaiserliche Marine (Imperial German Navy) during 1918.

Development and design

Operational experience with the W.12 showed that, while it was an extremely successful design - showing excellent performance and manoeuvrability - there was a requirement for a floatplane fighter with greater endurance. To meet this requirement, Ernst Heinkel, chief designer of the Hansa und Brandenburgische Flugzeug-Werke, designed the W.19.

The W.19 was of similar layout to the W.12, but considerably larger (i.e. with a 2.6 m/8.5 ft greater wingspan and a 1 m/3.3 ft greater length). It was a single-engined tractor biplane, with two bay wings. The aircraft was fitted with a similar inverted tailplane to the W.12 in order to give unobstructed fields of fire to the observer, who was seated in a rear cockpit, immediately behind the pilot. In order to compensate for the increased size and weight over the W.12, the W.19 was fitted with a more powerful Maybach Mb.IV engine.

Production aircraft were armed with one or two synchronised 7.92 mm (.312 in) LMG 08/15 machine guns firing forward and a single 7.92 mm (.312) LMG 08/15 machine gun for the observer. One aircraft was fitted with a 20 mm Becker cannon for tests.

Operational history
The W.19 entered service with the German Navy in January 1918, operating from bases at Borkum and Zeebrugge for operations over the North Sea. It was used in support of the smaller W.19 or W.29 fighters, often scouting ahead for targets while the smaller aircraft waited on the sea. Combats often occurred between the various Hansa-Brandenburg fighters and large British flying boats such as Felixstowe F.2s and Curtiss Americas.

The W.19 continued in service until the Armistice, 55 being produced. While it had been planned to supplement it with the W.33 monoplane, only a few had been delivered by the time the war ended.

Operators

Kaiserliche Marine

Specifications (W.19)

See also

References

Bibliography

Gray, Peter and Thetford, Owen. German Aircraft of the First World War. London: Putnam, 1962
Green, William and Swanborough, Gordon. The Complete Book of Fighters. New York: Smithmark, 1994. .

1910s German fighter aircraft
W.19
Floatplanes
Single-engined tractor aircraft
Biplanes
Aircraft first flown in 1917